Dimagnesium phosphate is a compound with formula MgHPO4. It is a Mg2+ salt of monohydrogen phosphate.  The trihydrate is well known, occurring as a mineral.

It can be formed by reaction of stoichiometric quantities of magnesium oxide with phosphoric acid.
MgO + H3PO4 → MgHPO4 + H2O
Dissolving monomagnesium phosphate in water, forms phosphoric acid and depositing a solid precipitate of dimagnesium phosphate trihydrate:
Mg(H2PO4)2  +  3 H2O  →   Mg(HPO4).3H2O  +  H3PO4

The compound is used as a nutritional supplement, especially for infants and athletes. Its E number is E343.

See also 
 Magnesium phosphate

References 

Acid salts
Phosphates
Magnesium compounds
E-number additives